The Nastia Liukin Cup (formerly the Nastia Liukin Supergirl Cup from 2010–11) is an annual artistic gymnastics competition held in the United States and hosted by Olympic gymnast Nastia Liukin.

History  
In August 2009, USA Gymnastics announced that they had partnered with 2008 Olympic champion Nastia Liukin to create a competitive opportunity for the country's top Junior Olympic gymnasts that is intended to serve as a debut for pre-elite competitors on the national stage.  The inaugural Nastia Liukin Cup was held in 2010 and had 36 participants.
 
Eligible to compete are Level 10 female gymnasts in both the junior and senior fields.  Gymnasts will be chosen to participate from a series of invitationals known as the Nastia Liukin Cup Series.  Prior to 2014, junior and senior gymnasts competed in the same field.

Champions

Notable former competitors

Olympians 
 Gabby Douglas – 2012 and 2016 Olympic Champion; 4th in 2010
 MyKayla Skinner – 2020 Olympic silver medalist on vault, 2016 Olympic alternate; 7th in 2010, 5th in 2011

World Champions 
 Morgan Hurd – 2017 (all-around) and 2018 World Champion (team); 14th in 2014
 Ashton Locklear – 2016 Olympic alternate and 2014 World Champion (team); 7th in 2013
 Maggie Nichols - 2015 World Champion (team), 8x NCAA Champion; 20th in 2011
 Kayla Williams – 2009 World Champion (vault); 4th in 2011

NCAA Champions 
 Haleigh Bryant – 2021 NCAA Champion (vault); 1st in 2018 and 2020
 Georgia Dabritz – 2015 NCAA Champion (uneven bars); 10th in 2011
 Nia Dennis – 2014 Pac Rim Champion, 2018 NCAA Champion (team); 5th in 2012
 Ashleigh Gnat – 2017 NCAA Champion (floor); 21st in 2010, 22nd in 2012
 Felicia Hano – 2018 NCAA Champion (team); 25th in 2013
 Alex McMurtry – 4x NCAA Champion, 2017 NCAA All-Around Champion; 1st in 2013, 2nd in 2012
 Anastasia Webb – 4x NCAA Champion; 2021 NCAA All-Around Champion; 9th in 2017
 Natalie Wojcik – 2019 (beam) and 2021 NCAA Champion (team); 4th in 2016, 2017, 2018

Other 
 Sloane Blakely – Former national team member (2019); 13th in 2021
 Kailin Chio – 2021 Junior Pan American (team) and Pan American Games Champion (team, floor); 15th in 2018
 Kaitlin De Guzman – 2017 Southeast Asian Games Champion (uneven bars) ; 16th in 2014, 11th in 2015
 Olivia Dunne – Former national team member (2017); 2017 City of Jesolo Champion; 11th in 2020
 Emily Gaskins – Former national team member (2013–15); 19th in 2013
 Olivia Greaves – 2019 International Gymnix Champion (team); 10th in 2018
 Amelia Hundley – 2014 Pan American and 2015 Pan American Games Champion; 2nd in 2011
 McKenna Kelley – 3x NCAA silver medalist (team); 1st in 2014
 Lilly Lippeatt – Former national team member (2019–21); 2x  Gymnix champion 7th in 2017
 Gabby Perea – Former national team member (2016–19) 2019 city of Jesolo champion; 6th in 2020
 Lexie Priessman – 2012 Pac Rim Champion; 2010 NLC Champion
 Emily Schild – 2015 Pan American Games Champion; 19th in 2013
 Alyona Shchennikova – Former national team member (2017–19); 17th in 2014
 Faith Torrez – Former national team member (2020–21); 3rd in 2018, 7th in 2019 and 2022

References

External links
Official website

Gymnastics competitions in the United States
Recurring sporting events established in 2010
2010 establishments in the United States